West Virginia Route 67 is an east–west state highway located within Brooke County. The western terminus of the route is at West Virginia Route 2 on the southern edge of Wellsburg. The eastern terminus is at the Pennsylvania state line east of Bethany, where WV 67 continues east as Pennsylvania Route 331.

References

Major intersections

067
Transportation in Brooke County, West Virginia